Michele Orsini (died 1493) was a Roman Catholic prelate who served as Bishop of Pula (1475–1493).

Biography
On 8 March 1475, Michele Orsini was appointed by Pope Sixtus IV as Bishop of Pula. 
On 2 April 1475, he was consecrated bishop by Marco Barbo, Patriarch of Aquileia with Leonello Chiericato, Bishop of Arbe, serving as co-consecrator. 
He served as Bishop of Pula until his death in 1493.

References

External links and additional sources
 (for Chronology of Bishops) 
 (for Chronology of Bishops) 

15th-century Italian Roman Catholic bishops
1493 deaths
Bishops appointed by Pope Sixtus IV